Eckhard Weymann (born in 1953) is a German music therapist.

Born in Wuppertal, Weymann studied piano pedagogy at the Hochschule für Musik und Tanz Köln and completed his music-therapeutic training from 1978 to 1980 in Mentorenkurs Musiktherapie Herdecke. Together with Frank Grootaers, Tilmann Weber and Rosemarie Tüpker he founded the Institut für Musiktherapie und Morphologie (IMM)
.

Publications 
 Aus der Seele gespielt : eine Einführung in die Musiktherapie. (2000). With Hans-Helmut Decker-Voigt.
 Vermittlungen ... musically speaking : zum improvisationsunterricht im musiktherapiestudium. (2001). With Carl Bergstrøm-Nielsen
 Zwischentöne : psychologische Untersuchungen zur musikalischen Improvisation. (2004)
 Klangbrücken Musiktherapie in der häuslichen Versorgung von Menschen mit Demenz - ein Leitfaden für die Praxis. (2015)
 Ethics in music therapy: how to address ethical questions, and how to find ways to handle ethical dilemmas. With Thomas Stegemann.
 Lexicon Musiktherapie. (2009). With Hans-Helmut Decker-Voigt

References

External links 
 
 

Music therapists
1953 births
Living people
Musicians from Wuppertal